This is a survey of the postage stamps and postal history of Pietersburg.

After the fall of Pretoria to the British in June 1900 during the Boer War, the Transvaal government re-located to Pietersburg but by March 1901 supplies of stamps were short and the Boer government authorised a series of type-set stamps for use within their area of control. The stamps were issued on 20 March 1901 and remained in use until Pietersburg was captured on 9 April, and as late as May in other places.

Although only in use for a short time, the stamps include a very large number of varieties caused by the conditions and method of their production which make them popular with specialists.

See also
Postage stamps and postal history of Transvaal

References

External links
Anglo-Boer War Philatelic Society

Pietersburg
Postal system of South Africa